The 1963 International Cross Country Championships was held in San Sebastián, Spain, at the  on 17 March 1963. The distance for the men's race was reduced from the traditional 9 miles (14.5 km) to 7.5 miles (12.1 km).  A preview of the event was given in the Glasgow Herald.

Complete results for men, junior men, medallists, 
 and the results of British athletes were published.

Medallists

Individual Race Results

Men's (7.5 mi / 12.1 km)

Junior Men's (4.7 mi / 7.5 km)

Team Results

Men's

Junior Men's

Participation
An unofficial count yields the participation of 125 athletes from 11 countries.

 (14)
 (14)
 (9)
 (8)
 (12)
 (9)
 (11)
 (14)
 (9)
 (14)
 (11)

See also
 1963 in athletics (track and field)

References

International Cross Country Championships
International Cross Country Championships
Cross
International Cross Country Championships
Sport in San Sebastián
Cross country running in Spain